Kanariku is a lake of Estonia.

See also 
 List of lakes of Estonia

Lakes of Estonia